The Cow Knob salamander (Plethodon punctatus), also known as the white-spotted salamander (not to be confused with the white-spotted slimy salamander, (P. cylindraceus)), is a species of salamander in the family Plethodontidae.
It is endemic to the United States. It is found on Shenandoah Mountain, Nathaniel Mountain and Great North Mountain in eastern West Virginia and western Virginia. Most of its known locations are in the George Washington National Forest.

Its natural habitats are temperate forests, talus, and high elevations.

It is threatened by habitat loss and climate change. While it is a rare species, it is abundant in small localities.

Description
This species is black with white spots. It can be distinguished from similar-looking species by webbing on back feet, light pink coloring on throat, pinkish hue on snout, and dorso-ventrally flattened head.

Behavior
Like most woodland salamanders, this species is mostly nocturnal.

References

Amphibians of the United States
Plethodon
Taxonomy articles created by Polbot
Amphibians described in 1971